Southport Offshore Rescue Trust (SORT) is the registered charity that runs the Southport Independent Lifeboat, a marine and land based search and rescue organisation on the Sefton coastline.

It is one of many Independent lifeboats in Britain and Ireland not supported by the RNLI.

The Southport Lifeboat have helped in the safe return of over 250 people since being formed in 1988, and aim to give the crew the best equipment possible to help save lives on the coastline.

The crew currently operate two lifeboats, three ATV quad bikes, Drones, mud rescue equipment and a land based search team from the old RNLI boathouse, built in 1886, and are trained to deal with a wide range of incidents.

The Southport Offshore Rescue Trust has declared facility status with UK Coastguard.

In January 2022, the new Southport Lifeboat Station became operational and the old lifeboat house was closed.

History

Early History

Southport Lifeboat has a proud and dramatic history, the earliest service, crewed and organised by local fishermen, was saving lives 20 years before the formation of the RNLI.

A lifeboat station was established in Southport in 1840.

RNLI in Southport and the Mexico Disaster

December 1886 saw the worst ever lifeboat disaster in British history, the Southport and St Anne's lifeboats disaster or the Mexico Disaster.

Closure by RNLI in 1925

The station was closed in 1925 by the RNLI.

The Lifeboat house was used by the council for storage and Southport was provided lifeboat cover by New Brighton to the South, and Lytham to the North.

Reformation as Independent Lifeboat

Southport Lifeboat was reformed following accidents off the coast where local men lost their lives. After the accidents in 1987, bereaved relatives started a campaign to bring a lifeboat back to Southport. In December 1988 the first boat since 1925 came on station at Southport.

She was a  Carson rigid inflatable (RIB), originally powered by twin  Mariner outboards, but refitted in 1995 with a single  Suzuki and a  auxiliary engine. She had self-righting capability, integral fuel tanks and a top speed of around 30 knots. She was named the "Geoff Clements" after one of the young men who perished in the 1987 accidents.

In 1995 a new Lifeboat was brought into service. The "Bessie Worthington" was a  RIB manufactured by Delta Power Services in Stockport for the Southport Lifeboat’s requirements, meeting all the necessary specifications including SOLAS (The international organisation for Safety of Life at Sea). The boat was originally powered by twin 90HP Suzuki outboard engines. These were changed to 90HP Mariners in 1998. The "Bessie Worthington" had full self-righting capability activated by the crew after the unlikely event of capsize by pulling handles on the outside of the transom. Delta were responsible for supplying all the electrics and navigation systems (GPS Radio, echo sounder, EPIRB).

During the years following the millennium two quad bikes & an ex RNLI D Class were added to the equipment. The bikes are invaluable for fast response and for searching large areas of beach quickly. The D class allows a good platform for crew training as well as for searching the shallow waters north of Southport Pier and providing invaluable backup to the main boat.

In early 2005 a campaign was launched to replace the "Bessie Worthington". An ambitious target of £120,000 was set to purchase a VTHalmatic Arctic 24. By September 2006 enough money had been raised to commission VTHalmatic to start building the boat. Unfortunately whilst the remainder of the funds were being raised the price had gone up and by the time delivery was made the boat had cost around £140,000. The "Heather White" came into service in May 2007.

Present

With the opening of a charity shop in Birkdale in 2005, the Southport Lifeboat have been able to continually update the kit available for the crew.

The Heather White's engine's were upgraded from twin  to twin  outboards, and are now continually replaced after three years of service. The Honda ATV quad bikes used are also replaced every three years before signs of corrosion from the harsh environment cause problems. In 2018 the trust switched to Can-Am ATVs, adding a third quad to the team in January 2021.

In 2010, Southport joined LifeboatLotto.

In January 2022, the new Southport Lifeboat Station opened on Marine Drive. The building was dedicated to founder of the charity, Kath Wilson, in respect of her fundraising efforts at the Lifeboat Shop which paid for the majority of the building.

In June of 2022, a number of crew who met the eligibility criteria were awarded Queen Elizabeth II Platinum Jubilee Medals.

References

Bibliography

Emergency services in England
Sea rescue organisations of the United Kingdom
Organisations based in Merseyside